Pietro Fontana may refer to:

Pietro Fontana (engraver) (1762–1837), engraver
Pietro Fontana (sculptor) (1782–1857), sculptor
Pietro Fontana (engineer) (early 19th century), Spoletine engineer and agronomist
Pietro Fontana (painter) (1899–1968), abstract painter
Pietro Fontana (athlete), Italian racewalker